Maureen Adams (born 27 August 1937) is an Australian archer. She competed in the 1976 Summer Olympics.

References

1937 births
Living people
Archers at the 1976 Summer Olympics
Australian female archers
Olympic archers of Australia